The Teton County Courthouse is a building in Driggs, Idaho which was listed on the National Register of Historic Places in 1987.

Its design is attributed to C.A. Sundberg and it was built by Charles Zollinger.

Its NRHP nomination concluded: "Like most courthouses in Idaho, the building represents the most elaborate and monumental architectural design in its community."

See also
 List of National Historic Landmarks in Idaho
 National Register of Historic Places listings in Teton County, Idaho

References

 1924 establishments in Idaho
 Buildings and structures in Teton County, Idaho
 Courthouses on the National Register of Historic Places in Idaho
 Government buildings completed in 1924
 National Register of Historic Places in Teton County, Idaho
 Neoclassical architecture in Idaho